In My Blood may refer to:

 "In My Blood", a song by Alesso on the 2015 album Forever
 "In My Blood" (Black Stone Cherry song), 2011
 "In My Blood" (Shawn Mendes song), 2018
 "In My Blood" (The Veronicas song), 2016
 In My Blood (En Mi Sangre), an album by Breed 77